Charles Partlow "Chic" Sale (August 25, 1885 – November 7, 1936) was an American actor and vaudevillian.

Early years 
Sale was born in Huron, South Dakota, and raised in Urbana, Illinois. He was a son of Frank and Lillie Belle (née Partlow) Sale, and the brother of actress and writer Virginia Sale-Wren.

Career
In 1920, after a tour wherein he played "rural parts", he was engaged by Christie Studios on Gower Street in Los Angeles. According to Grace Kingsley in the Jan. 28 edition of the Los Angeles Times, page II11, It now comes to light that Chic Sale, appearing at the Orpheum this week, will as soon as his present tour is finished, about the middle of next month, return to town in the Capacity of a Christie star. Mr. Sale's first photoplay will be a five-reeler, adapted from Irvin S. Cobb's "The Smart Aleck," after which he will be starred in other well-known stories suitable to his talents. The item goes on to mention that Charles Christie, business head of the Christie studio, entered into a contract with Exceptional Pictures to produce the Sale film, to be distributed through Robertson-Cole, and notes Sale's occasional appearances in the Ziegfeld Follies and the Shubert Winter Garden shows. The movie was eventually named His Nibs, and co-starred Colleen Moore. Chic played many of the parts himself, the film being a spoof of the sort of "hick", backwater characterizations that were his specialty.

In 1929, inspired by a carpenter named 'Lem Putt' from his hometown of Urbana, Sale wrote The Specialist, a play about an outhouse builder. Because copyright infringement was widespread in Vaudeville, Sale enlisted the aid of newspaper political cartoonist, Roy James, to adapt The Specialist into a book. Mr. James' illustrations brought Chic's humor to life and the book enjoyed great success. Sale spent the next several months responding to fan mail.

Sale had a career in Hollywood, appearing in various comic roles until his death from pneumonia in 1936. In contrast to his comic roles, one of his loftier appearances came as President Abraham Lincoln in 1935. The Perfect Tribute was a short film dramatizing Lincoln's disappointment at the meager reaction to his Gettysburg Address. He encounters a dying and blind soldier who, not knowing he is addressing the President himself, tells Lincoln how inspiring the speech was.

Although an obscure figure today, Sale was a well-known popular culture figure during the 1930s, and was often the subject of jokes by comedians like Groucho Marx, usually in reference to The Specialist. Chic is also mentioned as an aside late in the Marx Brothers film, Animal Crackers, in a conversation between Ravelli (Chico Marx) and Captain Spaulding. For many years—even after his death—"Chic Sale" was used as a euphemism for an outhouse. He is known to have found this unflattering, calling it "a terrible thing to have happen".

Filmography

References

External links

 
 
 Page at the Outhouse Museum Wall of Fame
 Chic Sale and The Specialist 
 Charles sale at Find A Grave

American male film actors
American male silent film actors
American male stage actors
People from Huron, South Dakota
People from Urbana, Illinois
Vaudeville performers
1885 births
1936 deaths
Male actors from South Dakota
Male actors from Illinois
20th-century American male actors
20th-century American dramatists and playwrights
Deaths from pneumonia in California